Novak Djokovic defeated the defending champion Rafael Nadal in the final, 7–5, 6–4 to win the men's singles tennis title at the 2011 Madrid Open. It was Djokovic's third ATP Masters 1000 title of the year, his sixth title of the year, and the 24th title of his career.

Seeds
The top eight seeds received a bye into the second round.

Qualifying

Draw

Finals

Top half

Section 1

Section 2

Bottom half

Section 3

Section 4

External links
Main Draw

Men's Singles